A610 may refer to:

 Renault Alpine GTA/A610, an automobile produced by the Renault-owned French manufacturer Alpine
 A610 road (England), a road connecting Nottingham and Ambergate
 Quebec Autoroute 610, a short spur road located in Sherbrooke, Quebec
 Powershot a610, a Canon digital camera
 FinePix A610, a Fuji digital camera